Lancia Esatau is a series of truck and bus chassis produced by Italian manufacturer Lancia Industrial Vehicles from 1947 to 1973. 13,362 examples were produced.

Trucks
Lancia Esatau truck chassis were produced from 1947 to 1963, when the model was replaced by the Lancia Esagamma.
The first version was called Esatau 864, which was a 4×2 chassis. The Esatau 964, in a 6×2 configuration, was introduced the following year. The engine was an 8245 cc overhead-cam inline six diesel producing  at 2000 rpm.

The forward control Esatau A was introduced in 1955. The 864 and 964 were discontinued in 1957, the last conventional cab trucks built by Lancia.

The trucks were also used by the Italian army for transporting soldiers and army vehicles.

Buses and trolleybuses
Lancia Esatau chassis for city buses remained in production from 1948 through 1973.

The bus was primarily used in Italy for public transport and it was produced in a small series. They were used in Rome, Milan and Turin. Trolley bus and articulated versions were also made.

Lancia Esatau V.10
The Lancia Esatau V.10 was in production from 1948 to 1953. It had an engine of 122HP.

Lancia Esatau V.11
The V.11 was manufactured from 1951 to 1952, with the body from Garavini. It was powered by a Lancia V10 engine, producing . In the side of the doors the seats are double. A total of 52 were produced.

A  trolleybus version was built for Athens in Greece, with 46 in service. The V.11 trolley bus version had two doors, and had capacity for 27 seated and 73 standing passengers. The V.11 was used in Athens from 1961 until 1991. The same  trolleybuses was used in Florence and in Capua too.

Lancia Esatau V.81
The Lancia Esatau V.81 was produced from 1953 to 1959. Most bodies were made by Viberti, with the last 23 by Pistoiesi. A total of 183 were built. The V10 originally produced  and from 1957 .

The weight of a Lancia Esatau V.81 is 9,3 tonnes. The bus had 18 seats and space for an additional 30 standing passengers.

References

Esatau
Esatau
Road transport in Italy
Vehicles introduced in 1947